Lara Álvarez González (born in Gijón on May 29, 1986) is a Spanish journalist and television presenter.

Biography 
She studied at the Inmaculada School in Gijón and graduated in journalism at the Villanueva University. One of her teachers at the university was Nieves Herrero, who gave her her first opportunity at the age of 19 as a contributor to the program Hoy por ti onTelemadrid. In 2006, before starting her career as a journalist and sports presenter, she participated in an advertising campaign by Tiempo BBDO for MTV: a song entitled "Amo a Laura -pero esperaré hasta el matrimonio-", a parody of pre-marital chastity, performed by a fake musical group called Los Happiness. She was host of the program Ahorro y finanzas for TeleAsturias and in 2010 she was a reporter for the program Animax Comandos, on the Animax channel.

Also in 2010 she joined, along with Enrique Marqués and Juan Antonio Villanueva, the team of the program Marca gol, of Marca TV, and the sports news program Tiramillas, of the same channel. On December 21 of the same year she joined the team of La Sexta Deportes, where she worked as a presenter and reporter, and on December 31 of the same month she was in charge of the New Year's Eve chimes for MARCA TV with the director of the channel, Felipe del Campo.

On July 11, 2011, she joined Cuatro, where she was in charge of sports information for the news program Qué quieres que te diga, an adaptation of España Directo, which was a ratings failure and was withdrawn a few weeks after its premiere. From September of the same year until February 2012, she presented the night edition of Deportes Cuatro, a program she left to join the new MotoGP broadcasting team.

On February 26, 2013 Mediaset España announced that she and Marco Rocha were being fired to broadcast the MotoGP races of the following season. On August 22 of the same year she signed with La Sexta to co-present the second season of Jugones, a sports news program, until March 4, 2014, when she announced that she was leaving the program to undertake new projects. At the end of the same month she began collaborating with the program En el aire on the same channel.

At the end of August 2014, it was announced her incorporation, as co-host, to the morning program Espejo público, at Antena 3. On September 23 of the same year, it was announced her incorporation to the radio program 80 y la madre, at M80 Radio, and in December it was announced her return to the Mediaset España group. A month later, in January 2015, she joined the program Todo va bien as a replacement for the singer Edurne, and on March 11 it was confirmed her incorporation as a presenter from the island of the program Supervivientes on Telecinco. Lara has repeated her role as presenter in the following 6 editions of the survival contest.

From September 2015 she co-hosted Límite 48 horas of Gran Hermano from inside the house of Guadalix de la Sierra. In early 2016 it was announced that she would repeat as presenter of Supervivientes and in September of the same year she returned as co-presenter of Límite 48 horas of Gran Hermano 17. In early November 2016 it was confirmed that she would present with Carlos Sobera the New Year's Eve chimes from the Puerta del Sol in Madrid for Mediaset España.

In March 2017 she joined the program Dani & Flo presented by Florentino Fernández y Dani Martinez on Cuatro. In August of the same year it was announced her incorporation to the program as a new presenter. In 2019 it was announced her incorporation as presenter of the international contest Juegos sin fronteras, along with Joaquín Prat, broadcast on Telecinco in 2020. That same year she co-presents the second edition of the game show La casa fuerte, also on Telecinco.

In 2021, she debuted in music with the song "Juntos somos más", together with Beatriz Luengo and Yotuel Romero for the Euro 2020 on Mediaset.

Trajectory

Television

Discography 
 «Amo a Laura» (2006) with Los Happiness for Tiempo BBDO's advertising campaign for para MTV España.
 «Juntos somos más» (2021) with Beatriz Luengo and Yotuel Romero, Mediaset's anthem for the Euro 2020.

Awards and nominations 
 Spanish Academy of Television Arts and Sciences Awards

 Cosmopolitan Awards

References

External links 
 Lara Álvarez on Twitter

1986 births
Living people
UNICEF Goodwill Ambassadors
Colegio de la Inmaculada (Gijón) alumni
Spanish television presenters
Sports journalists
Spanish women journalists